The 2020–21 Northeastern Huskies men's basketball team represented Northeastern University during the 2020–21 NCAA Division I men's basketball season. The Huskies, led by 15th-year head coach Bill Coen, play their home games at Matthews Arena in Boston, Massachusetts as members of the Colonial Athletic Association.

Previous season
The Huskies finished the 2019–20 season 17–16, 9–9 in CAA to finish in sixth place. They lost in the finals of the CAA tournament to Hofstra.

Roster

Schedule and results

|-
!colspan=9 style=| Regular season

|-
!colspan=9 style=| CAA tournament
|-

Source

References

Northeastern Huskies men's basketball seasons
Northeastern
Northeastern Huskies men's basketball
Northeastern Huskies men's basketball